Tekfur ambarı (a.k.a. Tekir ambarı, literally "lord's storehouse") is a large cistern in Silifke ( Seleukeia) ilçe district center of Mersin Province, Turkey. It was built during the early years of Byzantine Empire. The building material is face stone. The total water capacity is about 12 000 tonnes. At the east side of the cistern there is a spiral staircase. There are 8 niches at the 46 m dimension and 5 niches at the 23 m dimension.

See also
List of Roman cisterns

References

External links
 For images

Silifke District
Byzantine architecture in Turkey
Roman cisterns
Reservoirs in Turkey
Cisterns in Mersin Province
Archaeological sites in Mersin Province, Turkey